The Weatherby Award is awarded annually for remarkable lifetime achievements in the field of hunting and conservation. It is considered "the Nobel Prize equivalent in hunting and conservationism" and the pinnacle to a long, successful hunting career. Although it was first awarded in 1956, the Weatherby Foundation International was only established in 1988 to honour the deceased Roy Weatherby, founder of the eponymous gun manufacturer, Weatherby, Inc. The Foundation’s mission statement is “to educate youth and the non-hunting public on the beneficial role of ethical sport hunting and its contribution to wildlife conservation, and to protect our constitutional right to do so”.

Laureates
The list of winners is available at the official Weatherby Foundation website.

Laureates per country 
The following table shows the number of laureates per country:

See also
Weatherby, Inc.
List of big-game hunters

References

External links
 About the Weatherby Award

Awards established in 1988
Environmental awards
1988 establishments in the United States